Jack Sellers (July 27, 1944 – October 24, 2016) was an American professional stock car racing driver and team owner. Sellers was a long-time competitor in the NASCAR K&N Pro Series West, formerly known as the Winston West Series.

Racing career

Sellers made his K&N Pro Series West debut in 1985 when the series was still known as NASCAR Winston West Grand National Division. He made his first start at Sonoma, driving a self-owned Oldsmobile. During his Rookie year Sellers raced part-time in the West Series. Sellers was sponsored by Coca-Cola as his family owned the Coca-Cola bottling plant in Sacramento. Sellers started racing full-time in 1987, qualifying for 6 of the 8 races that season. He also scored his first top-ten finish, when he finished seventh at the Spokane Grand Prix Course. Sellers finished tenth in the point standings that season. In 1989 Sellers scored three top-ten finishes and finished seventh in the point standings. In 1990 Sellers led eight laps at Tri-City Raceway. It would be first and the only time in his career that he was the race leader.  1993 would turn out to be the best season of Sellers' career. He finished in the top-ten six times and finished fifth in the point standings. 

During the late eighties and the early nineties Sellers attempted 15 Winston Cup Series races. This was the era of “companion races,” where the two Winston Cup races at Sonoma and Phoenix invited drivers from the Winston West Series. After failing to qualify for the first six races he attempted, Sellers finally qualified for his first Winston Cup race at the 1990 Banquet Frozen Foods 300. Sellers drove a bright green Buick, a former Quaker State car that was driven by Ricky Rudd in his King Racing days. Sellers had a troubled debut as he had to put the car behind the wall due to an oil leak. After the car was repaired Sellers returned to the track but only a few laps later the car lost an engine in the Esses, spun 180 degrees, and backed hard into the tire barriers. Sellers repaired his car again and finished the race in 40th place, albeit 33 laps behind the leaders. Two years later Sellers qualified for his second Winston Cup race, again at Sonoma. He qualified in the 43rd and final position. He retired from the race on lap 48 with transmission problems. Sellers also tried to qualify for the inaugural Brickyard 400 in 1994, but failed to make the race.

After 1994 Sellers continued to race in the West Series on a part-time basis. Scoring several top-ten finishes in 1995 and 1996. He cut down on his schedule after the 1996 season. Only running eight races between 1997 and 1999. In 2000 made a full-time return to the West Series. Mostly running midpack. In 2002 at Kansas Speedway Sellers scored his first top-ten finish in over five years. He continued to race full-time till the 2006 season. After that Sellers ran most races every season but did not race full-time again until the 2014 season. That season Sellers finished ninth in the points standings. He also scored his final career top-ten finish at Iowa Speedway. After the 2014 season Sellers reduced his schedule. He ran four races in the 2015, as well as the 2016 season. The final race of the 2016 season at All American Speedway would turn out to be the last start of Sellers' career. During his career Sellers entered over 300 West Series races and started a record 282 of them. He scored a total of 32 top-ten finishes. His best finish was seventh, a feat he accomplished six times.

In an interview in 2011 Sellers talked about his longevity in the West Series. “I never would have dreamed that I would go this far,” Sellers said with his familiar chuckle. “When you’ve been doing it so long, it’s not something that you can just quit.”

Death
Sellers died at his ranch in Sacramento, California on October 24, 2016, aged 72. He had finished 14th at All American Speedway in the 2016 K&N Pro Series West finale just a little over a week before.

Motorsports career results

NASCAR
(key) (Bold – Pole position awarded by qualifying time. Italics – Pole position earned by points standings or practice time. * – Most laps led.)

Winston Cup Series

Busch Series

K&N Pro Series East

K&N Pro Series West

ARCA Hooters SuperCar Series
(key) (Bold – Pole position awarded by qualifying time. Italics – Pole position earned by points standings or practice time. * – Most laps led.)

References

External links
 
 Jack Seller’s #NASCAR Cup Debut 
 Rest In Peace 'Cowboy Jack' – Jack Sellers 

1944 births
2016 deaths
NASCAR drivers
Racing drivers from Sacramento, California
ARCA Menards Series drivers